Explorers Monument is a  summit located in the Grand Canyon, in Coconino County of northern Arizona, US. It is situated 3.5 miles due west of Mount Huethawali, within a meander of the Colorado River. It towers over  directly above the river, providing rafters a view of this landmark. Explorers Monument is topped by rock of the Pennsylvanian-Permian Supai Group which overlays cliff-forming Mississippian Redwall Limestone, which in turn overlays Cambrian Tonto Group. According to the Köppen climate classification system, Explorers Monument is located in a cold semi-arid climate zone.

History
Explorers Monument was originally named "Marcos Monument" by George Wharton James because it adjoins Marcos Terrace, which is named for Marcos de Niza, a Franciscan friar and explorer. Subsequently, the United States Geological Survey proposed and in 1908 officially adopted the name "Explorers Monument" to honor Grand Canyon explorers Joseph Christmas Ives, George Wheeler, Edward Beale, Almon Thompson, and John Newberry.

See also
 Geology of the Grand Canyon area
 History of the Grand Canyon area

Gallery

References

External links 

 Weather forecast: National Weather Service
 Aerial view Explorers Monument, Mancos Terrace, Colorado River: Flickr

Grand Canyon
Landforms of Coconino County, Arizona
Colorado Plateau
Grand Canyon National Park
Grand Canyon, North Rim
Grand Canyon, North Rim (west)